Do Revenge is a 2022 American teen black comedy film directed by Jennifer Kaytin Robinson, who co-wrote the screenplay alongside Celeste Ballard. It stars Camila Mendes, Maya Hawke, Austin Abrams, Rish Shah, and Sarah Michelle Gellar, and is loosely inspired by Alfred Hitchcock's Strangers on a Train (1951). It was released on Netflix on September 16, 2022, and received generally positive reviews from critics.

Plot 
Drea is a popular student attending Rosehill Country Day High School in Miami on scholarship, but becomes a social outcast after an intimate video she sent to her equally popular boyfriend Max is leaked online. Despite his denial, Drea blames Max for the video's release, and they break up. 

Over the summer, Drea works at a tennis camp where she meets Eleanor, who is transferring to Rosehill as a senior. When Drea's car fails to start, Eleanor offers her a ride and tells her about also becoming an outcast when a false rumor spread that she forcibly kissed Carissa, another Rosehill student, at a summer camp years earlier.

When Drea and Eleanor realize they will not get justice on their own, they devise a plan to exact revenge on the other's rival: Drea on Carissa and Eleanor on Max. Following a makeover, Eleanor slowly infiltrates Drea's old clique while Drea tries to get close to Carissa by working at the school farm, also befriending Russ, a fellow student and Carissa's friend. 

Eleanor is invited to a pool party thrown by Max, where she discovers he is cheating on his new girlfriend, Tara. Drea runs into Carissa at the beach with Russ, and steals her keys to the farm's locked greenhouse full of marijuana and magic mushrooms.

At the school's Senior Ring Ceremony, Drea places the drugs found at the secret greenhouse in their classmates' dinner with the intention of stealing Max's phone to obtain evidence of his wrongdoings. She also anonymously tips off the headmaster about the greenhouse, getting Carissa expelled. While searching through Max's messages, Drea and Eleanor find photos and messages from other girls at school stretching back years.

At the Valentine's Day assembly, Eleanor shares Max's texts to the entire student body, but the plan fails when Max and Tara pretend to be a polyamorous couple. Drea spirals after getting rejected from her dream school, Yale University, and concocts a new plan to destroy Max and her popular former friends at the upcoming Admissions Party, which can only be attended by those accepted by Ivy League schools. 

Eleanor begins to accept her new popularity and Drea's old friends, beginning a relationship with Max's younger sister Gabbi. When Max and his friends surprise her for her birthday, Drea crashes the party and nearly jeopardizes their revenge scheme. They fight, going their separate ways after Eleanor asserts that there is no evidence that Max leaked Drea's video. Gabbi overhears this and breaks up with Eleanor for taking Max's side.

Drea seeks dirt on Eleanor, visiting Carissa at a rehab facility for information. Carissa reveals Eleanor is actually "Nosey" Nora Cutler, a girl they both went to summer camp with. It was Drea who outed Nora and spread the rumor, an event she had forgotten, which prompted Eleanor to change her name and undergo a rhinoplasty. Drea confronts Eleanor, who reveals she had been playing her all along, aiming to cause the same pain she endured from the rumor. Eleanor threatens to frame Drea's mother for drug possession if she refuses to expose her old friends at the Admissions Party. Later, Eleanor purposefully T-bones Drea's car, sending her to the hospital to create an elaborate sob story that permits access to the party.

During the Admissions Party, Drea reveals Eleanor to be "Nosey Nora" to Max and friends, but immediately regrets it and apologizes to Eleanor for her past actions. Their emotional reconciliation is interrupted when Max reveals he discovered their plot against him. He plans to expose them and confesses to releasing Drea's video, unaware Eleanor is videoing him. The women project Max's confession to the entire party, turning everyone against him. Max is expelled from Rosehill and his spot at Yale is offered to Drea, who rejects it. She and Eleanor skip graduation and drive off into the sunset.

In a mid-credits scene, Drea apologizes to Russ, Eleanor reconciles with Gabbi, and Max joins a toxic masculinity support group.

Cast

Production

Casting 
On October 14, 2020, it was reported that Netflix was developing the film, then titled Strangers. Jennifer Kaytin Robinson co-wrote and directed the film, inspired by Alfred Hitchcock's Strangers on a Train (1951). In November 2020, Camila Mendes and Maya Hawke were reported to star. Additional cast members were announced in early 2021.

Filming 
Principal photography was scheduled to take place in Los Angeles in early 2021, but was changed to Atlanta, Georgia, and Miami, Florida, with the story taking place in Miami following a rewrite. Filming initially wrapped in August 2021 with later stages of production occurring in August 2022. Much of the filming took place at Oglethorpe University in Atlanta, Georgia.

Release 
The film was released on Netflix on September 16, 2022.

Reception 
 On Metacritic, the film has a weighted average score of 66 out of 100 based on 17 critics, indicating "generally favorable reviews."

Coleman Spilde of The Daily Beast called the film a "generation defining masterpiece", saying that "Once a decade, there comes a high school comedy so stylish, so witty, and so instantly influential that it cannot be topped. Netflix's colorful new romp is that movie." Amy Nicholson of The New York Times gave the film a B and described it as "a playful, sharp-fanged satire that feels like the '90s teen comedy hammered into modern emojis: crown, knife, fire, winky face." Matt Zoller Seitz of RogerEbert.com gave the film 3 out of 4 stars and said, "The film manages to blend all of its influences into a distinctive movie that is fully committed to its vision of high school as a handsomely costumed, art-directed snake pit filled with sadists who get off on other people's pain and embarrassment."

References

External links 
 
 

2022 black comedy films
2022 LGBT-related films
2020s American films
2020s buddy comedy films
2020s English-language films
2020s female buddy films
2020s high school films
2020s teen comedy films
American black comedy films
American buddy comedy films
American female buddy films
American films about revenge
American high school films
American teen comedy films
American teen LGBT-related films
English-language Netflix original films
Films based on works by Patricia Highsmith
Films set in Miami
Films shot in Atlanta
Films shot in Miami
LGBT-related black comedy films
LGBT-related buddy comedy films